The Tubuai rail (Gallirallus steadmani) is an extinct species of flightless bird in the Rallidae, or rail family.

History
It was described from subfossil remains found in 2007 by Robert Bollt at the Atiahara archaeological site, on the island of Tubuai in the Austral Islands of French Polynesia.  The site dates to the 13th and 14th centuries CE, from the early period of human habitation of the island.

Etymology
The species was named after David Steadman in recognition of his contributions to Pacific paleo-ornithology and the understanding of the radiation of Gallirallus-like rails.

References

Tubuai rail
†
Late Quaternary prehistoric birds
Extinct flightless birds
Extinct birds of Oceania
Holocene extinctions
Fossil taxa described in 2011
Tubuai rail